Vladimir Anatolyevich Fyodorov (19 February 1939 — 18 May 2021) was a Soviet and Russian actor and physicist.

Biography 
In 1964, Fyodorov graduated from the National Research Nuclear University MEPhI and he joined the Institute of Biophysics, USSR Ministry of Health. Vladimir Fyodorov's profession was nuclear physicist and he was the author of more than 50 scientific works and inventions. Many of his works have been translated into English. He was a student of Igor Kurchatov.

Career 
Fyodorov first appeared on the screen at the age of 32, when film director Aleksandr Ptushko invited the young scientist to play the role of the villain Chernomor in the film Ruslan and Lyudmila. Since then, Vladimir Fyodorov portrayed many characters with dwarfism, thanks to his small stature 130 cm (4 ft 3¼ inch) . The best-known film works include the aforementioned Chernomor and the villain and oligarch Turanchoks of the sci-fi movie Per Aspera Ad Astra.

In the late 1980s, Vladimir Fyodorov came on the professional scene and played in the productions of the Vakhtangov Theater. Since 1993, he has been an actor at Nikitsky Gate.

From 1997 to 1998 Fyodorov was a co-presenter and assistant to Leonid Yarmolnik in the game show Gold Rush.

Personal life 

Fyodorov was married to the actress Vera for 35 years.

In recent years, he had heart disease; in 2016 he had a stroke. He died on 18 May 2021.

Filmography
 1972 — Ruslan and Lyudmila as Chernomor
 1975 — Eager to Fear, Happiness Can Not See as servant
 1976 — The Legend of Thiele as jester
 1976 — The Twelve Chairs as thief
 1977 — Rings of Almanzor as pirate
 1977 — Nose as dwarf
 1979 — The Wild Hunt King Stach as Basil
 1980 — Per Aspera Ad Astra as Turanchoks
 1980 — At the Beginning of Glorious Days as dwarf
 1980 — The Youth of Peter the Great as jester
 1982 — The House That Swift Built as a dwarf with a gun
 1983 — The Comic Lover, or Love Venture of Sir John Falstaff as Jean-Claude
 1983 — Evenings on a Farm near Dikanka as dwarf
 1985 — The Black Arrow as dwarf
 1985 — After the Rain, on Thursday as werewolf
 1986 — Kin-dza-dza! as alien in yellow pants
 1987 — The End of Eternity as dwarf
 1988 — New Adventures of a Yankee in King Arthur's Court as dwarf
 1988 — One, Two — the Mountain Does Not Matter! as Suleymanchik
 1988 — Heart of a Dog as being
 1989 — Souvenir for the Public Prosecutor as dwarf
 1994 — Hagi-Tragger as killer
 1997 — All What We Have Long Dreamed of as dwarf in a German prison
 1999 — Two Nabokovs as Frederick Dobson
 2002 — House of Fools as Karlusha
 2008 — Plus One as episode
2009 — Anna Karenina as switchman
2011 — Once Upon a Time There Lived a Simple Woman as whacky
 2013 — Bombila. Continued as gravedigger Giant

References

External links
 
   Vladimir Fyodorov on Facebook 
  История жизни Владимира Анатольевича Фёдорова
 

1939 births
2021 deaths
20th-century Russian male actors
20th-century Russian physicists
21st-century Russian male actors
21st-century Russian physicists
Male actors from Moscow
Scientists from Moscow
Moscow Engineering Physics Institute alumni
Actors with dwarfism
Russian male film actors
Russian physicists
Russian television presenters
Soviet male film actors
Soviet physicists